Rob Bron (16 May 1945 – 5 October 2009) was a Grand Prix motorcycle road racer from the Netherlands. He had his best year in 1971 when he finished in third place in the 500cc world championship behind Giacomo Agostini and Keith Turner. Bron died on October 5, 2009.

Career statistics

Grand Prix motorcycle racing

Races by year
(key) (Races in bold indicate pole position) (Races in italics indicate fastest lap)

References

1945 births
2009 deaths
Dutch motorcycle racers
50cc World Championship riders
250cc World Championship riders
500cc World Championship riders
Sportspeople from Amsterdam
20th-century Dutch people